The Church of St Stephen (Spanish: Iglesia de San Esteban) is one of a number of medieval churches in Segovia, Spain. It dates from the 12th century and is noted for its Romanesque bell tower.

Conservation
The tower is designated a Bien de Interés Cultural and has been protected since 1896, when it was declared a National Monument (published in
the Madrid Gazette on 13 December 1896).

Since 1985 the church has been part of a World Heritage Site: the Old Town of Segovia and its Aqueduct. In giving this designation to Segovia, UNESCO noted that the outstanding monuments of the city included "several Romanesque churches".

References

Buildings and structures in Segovia
St Stephen
Romanesque architecture in Castile and León